Edward Charles Krzyzowski (January 16, 1914 – September 3, 1951) was a soldier in the United States Army during the Korean War. He posthumously received the Medal of Honor for his actions from August 31 to September 3, 1951 during the Battle of Bloody Ridge.

Medal of Honor citation

Rank and organization: Captain, U.S. Army, Company B, 9th Infantry Regiment, 2nd Infantry Division

Place and date: Near Tondul, Korea, from August 31, to September 3, 1951

Entered service at: Cicero, Ill. Born: January 16, 1914, Chicago, Ill. 

G.O. No.: 56, June 12, 1952. 

Citation:

Capt. Krzyzowski, distinguished himself by conspicuous gallantry and indomitable courage above and beyond the call of duty in action against the enemy as commanding officer of Company B. Spearheading an assault against strongly defended Hill 700, his company came under vicious crossfire and grenade attack from enemy bunkers. Creeping up the fire-swept hill, he personally eliminated 1 bunker with his grenades and wiped out a second with carbine fire. Forced to retire to more tenable positions for the night, the company, led by Capt. Krzyzowski, resumed the attack the following day, gaining several hundred yards and inflicting numerous casualties. Overwhelmed by the numerically superior hostile force, he ordered his men to evacuate the wounded and move back. Providing protective fire for their safe withdrawal, he was wounded again by grenade fragments, but refused evacuation and continued to direct the defense. On September 3, he led his valiant unit in another assault which overran several hostile positions, but again the company was pinned down by murderous fire. Courageously advancing alone to an open knoll to plot mortar concentrations against the hill, he was killed instantly by an enemy sniper's fire. Capt. Krzyzowski's consummate fortitude, heroic leadership, and gallant self-sacrifice, so clearly demonstrated throughout 3 days of bitter combat, reflect the highest credit and lasting glory on himself, the infantry, and the U.S. Army.

See also

List of Medal of Honor recipients
List of Korean War Medal of Honor recipients

Notes

References

1914 births
1951 deaths
United States Army Medal of Honor recipients
American military personnel killed in the Korean War
Korean War recipients of the Medal of Honor
American people of Polish descent
United States Army personnel of World War II
United States Army personnel of the Korean War
United States Army officers